Excalibur is a wooden roller coaster at Funtown Splashtown USA in Saco, Maine.  It is the tallest and longest roller coaster in Northern New England. The ride runs with a single 2-bench Philadelphia Toboggan Company train.  The ride's name is based on King Arthur's sword (Excalibur).

Excalibur is the only wooden roller coaster in the state of Maine, and the first wooden coaster in Maine in 50 years when it first opened.

The ride has been retracked by Martin & Vleminckx.

References 

Roller coasters in Maine
Roller coasters introduced in 1998